Dunmore from the  or , meaning "great fort", may refer to:

People
 Dunmore (surname)
 Earl of Dunmore, a title in the Peerage of Scotland, includes a list of earls
 Countess of Dunmore (disambiguation), a list of wives of earls of Dunmore

Places

Australia 
 Dunmore, New South Wales, a suburb of Shellharbour City
 Dunmore railway station
 Dunmore, Queensland, a rural locality in the Toowoomba Region

Ireland 
 Dunmore, County Galway, a town
 Dunmore, County Kilkenny, a civil parish in County Kilkenny
 Dunmore Cave, County Kilkenny
 Dunmore Head, in County kerry

United States 
 Dunmore, Pennsylvania, a borough
 Dunmore County, former name of Shenandoah County, Virginia
 Dunmore, West Virginia, an unincorporated community
 Lake Dunmore, Vermont

Elsewhere 
 Dunmore Town, Bahamas
 Dunmore, Alberta, Canada, a hamlet
 Dunmore, Falkirk, Scotland, a village

Other uses
 Dunmore School District, Pennsylvania
 Dunmore High School, Pennsylvania
 Dunmore McHales GAC a Gaelic football club, Ireland
 Dunmore Stadium, a greyhound racing track in Belfast, Northern Ireland
 Dunmore v. Ontario (Attorney General), a Canadian constitutional case

See also
 Dunmore East, a village in County Waterford, Ireland
 Dunmor, Kentucky
 Dunsmore